Thivolleo albicervix is a moth in the family Crambidae. It was described by Koen V. N. Maes in 2006. It is found in Cameroon, the Central African Republic, the Democratic Republic of the Congo, Kenya, Tanzania and Uganda.

References

Moths described in 2006
Pyraustinae